The Museum for Hamburg History is a history museum located in the city of Hamburg in northern Germany. The museum was established in 1908 and opened at its current location in 1922, although its parent organization was founded in 1839. The museum is located near the  park in the center of Hamburg. The museum is commonly reviewed among the museums of the city of Hamburg.

History

The Society of Hamburg History (Verein für Hamburgische Geschichte), founded in 1839, started compiling the Collection of Hamburg Antiquities (Sammlung Hamburger Altertümer). First exhibits included architectural fragments of the demolished St. Mary's Cathedral and two monasteries.

The main building at Holstenwall was designed by Fritz Schumacher and constructed between 1914 and 1922. The museum was built on the site of the former Bastion Henricus, a part of the baroque fortification which was erected between 1616 and 1625 by the Dutchman Jan van Valckenborgh in order to make the town impregnable.

The museum's courtyard was damaged during the Great fire of Hamburg in 1842 and fully restored in 1995. A glass dome over the inner courtyard was completed in 1989. The glass courtyard was completed by the firm of Von Gerkan, Marg and Partners. This provided more museum space without an actual new building, because it allowed increased use of the courtyard. The covered courtyard was actually envisioned, or at least considered, as part of the original design, however the construction of the covering was deferred. The design uses a steel gridshell.

The Hamburg Observatory occupied the museum's current site from 1825 to 1912 before being moved to Bergedorf. The area was part of the old city wall defences built by the Dutchman Jan van Valckenborgh. These walls were part of Bastion Henricus, which was a baroque fortification built between 1616 and 1625. The museum was formerly located at the Johanneum school.

The museum became state-owned under the direction of Otto Lauffer in the early 1900s, though this was changed back in 1999.

The museum adopted the name hamburgmuseum, and initials hm, in 2006. In 2008, the museum started a program called  (Society of Friends of the Museum for Hamburg History).

In 2010, a pirate skull with a nail in it was stolen from the museum. The skull was discovered in 1878, and forensic analysis believes it to be from the 1400s. At that time, it was common for pirates to be executed by being beheaded, and then the skull would be put on an iron stake to display the consequences of this activity. A more precise determination was attempted by the museum in 2004 by DNA analysis, but there was no further confirmation. It was thought this might be from a particular execution of 30 during the age of the Hanseatic League. The skull was stolen on January 9, 2010, and it was thought it may be the skull of (in)famous pirate Klaus Stoertebeker.
The skull was added to the museum's collection in 1922.

In 2016, the museum was considered as a candidate for repatriation of a century old German dog-tag. The dog-tag belonged to a soldier that had gone missing in action during World War I.

Exhibits in 2005
Over time, there is a gradual shift with some temporary exhibits also. Here the exhibits around 2005:

  (Clothing and fashion: costumes and clothing in Hamburg from 1550 to 1920)
  (Hamburgian Patronage: The example of the Lorenz-Meyer family)
  (Music and art in Hamburg)
  (Theatre and science in Hamburg)
  (Hamburg in the 20th century)
  (The forecourt of the Hamburgian exchange of 1558)
  ( Hamme, castle and city of the Hanse - Hamburg in mediaeval times)
  (Churches, canons and commerce - Hamburg in the early modern period)
  (Reformation in Hamburg)
  (Hamburg as centre of currencies)
  (The shipwreck of Wittenbergen)
  (Constructing and living and securing the Elbe from pirates)
  (Baroque merchant hall)
  (Townscape and constitution in the 17th century)
  (Hamburg 1650–1860)
  (The HafenCity - Hamburg in the 21st century)
  (The command bridge of steamboat WERNER)
  (About home decor)
  (History of the Jews in Hamburg)
  (The Klopstock room)
  (Baroque living rooms)
  (Handicraft and home decor)
  (1945. End of the war in Hamburg)

Interior and contents 

The museum has many artifacts preserved by the Society of Hamburg History founded in 1839. The Petri portal from Hamburg's St. Petri Church, built in 1604, was built into the museum courtyard in the 1990s.

The museum is known for having miniature scale models that show the history of the port. It is also a site for the club MEHEV, and the museum as one of the largest scale model railroads.

Permanent exhibitions

The museum's website lists its permanent exhibitions as:
 Hamburg in the 20th Century
 Hamburg's Historical Highlights
 Medieval Hamburg
 Hamburg and the Church
 Hamburg in the Early Modern Age
 Baroque Merchant Hall
 Cityscape and Constitution in the 17th Century
 The Dawning of the Modern Age
 The 1842 Fire
 Emigration via Hamburg
 Maritime Trade
 Hamburg in the 21st Century
 Navigation Bridge of the Werner Steamship
 The Arrival of the First Jews in Hamburg
 Enlightenment and Emancipation
 During the German Empire
 The Weimar Republic
 Persecution and the holocaust under the National Socialist regime
 Jewish Schools
 Jews and business in Hamburg
 Jewish Residential Areas and Living Conditions
 The Synagogue

Visitors 
The museum takes part in the Long Night of Museums of Hamburg. Die lange Nacht der Museen is a spring evening when museums like HM stay open past midnight, and has been held annually since the year 2000.

See also 
List of museums and cultural institutions in Hamburg

References

Further reading

External links 

Virtual tour of the Museum for Hamburg History provided by Google Arts & Culture

Museums established in 1922
Museums in Hamburg
Buildings and structures in Hamburg-Mitte
City museums in Germany
History of Hamburg
1922 establishments in Germany
Gerkan, Marg and Partners buildings
Tourist attractions in Hamburg